Te Atatu AFC is an amateur association football club in Te Atatū, New Zealand. The team's home ground is the Te Atatū Peninsula Park, and they compete in the NRF Championship.

History
They formed in 1960. The teams best run in the Chatham Cup, New Zealand's premier knockout tournament, was in 2016 when they made the final 16 beating Albany United, Oratia United and Waiheke United before losing 1–2 to Three Kings United in the fourth round. The club also made the last thirty-two twice before the 2016 run, first in 1997 and again in 2002.

Honours

Men's
Northern League Division Two B Winners
Northern League Division Four North Winners

Women's
AWFA Knockout Shield: Runners-up, 1993
Northern Premier Women's League: Winners, 1994
AWFA Knockout Shield: Winners, 1994
AWFA Champion-of-Champions: Winners, 1994

References

External links
 Te Atatu AFC Official Website
 Te Atatu AFC US1 Page

Association football clubs in Auckland
1960 establishments in New Zealand
Sport in West Auckland, New Zealand